There was a by-election in the Pakistani parliamentary constituency of NA-120 on 17 September 2017, following the decision given by the Supreme Court of Pakistan to disqualify Prime Minister Nawaz Sharif from public office. PML (N) candidate Kulsoom Nawaz Sharif secured 61,745 votes and defeated Yasmin Rashid of Pakistan Tehreek-e-Insaf.

Background
Following the decision given by the Supreme Court of Pakistan to disqualify Prime Minister Nawaz Sharif from public office, a by-election was triggered in his NA-120 constituency.

Immediately, speculation arose of PML (N) choosing the current Chief Minister of Punjab Shehbaz Sharif as a candidate for NA-120 as well as Prime Minister. Later on, however, Shehbaz Sharif was said to be continuing his position as Chief Minister of Punjab until 2018, ruling him out as a candidate. Subsequently, Nawaz Sharif’s wife, Kulsoom Nawaz, was chosen as the candidate for PML (N).

Campaign

The main challenger of Kulsoom Nawaz for the seat was Dr. Yasmin Rashid of PTI, who also contested the seat in 2013. She ran primarily on the issue that Nawaz Sharif and PML (N) were “corrupt” and that they did not do much for the constituency. The PML (N) campaign was run by Nawaz’s daughter, Maryam Nawaz Sharif, who claimed that the Supreme Court ruling was unfair and that Nawaz Sharif was the legitimate Prime Minister.

Result

Previous Result
Nawaz Sharif won this seat with 91,666 votes. 

|}

Result
Kulsoom Nawaz won this seat for PML (N), albeit with a much reduced majority of 14,646 due to gains by PTI and small Islamist Parties.
 

 

|-

|}

References 

2017 elections in Pakistan
By-elections in Pakistan
September 2017 events in Pakistan